Overlea High School (OHS) is a four-year public high school in Baltimore County, Maryland, United States. The school was opened in 1961.

About the school
The original building was constructed in the early-1960s. It is located on Kenwood Avenue in eastern Baltimore County near the I-695 and I-95 interchange. Though in an unincorporated part of the county, it serves the areas of White Marsh, Rosedale, Overlea, and Fullerton.

Overlea's school district borders Parkville High School, Perry Hall High School, Kenwood High School, and Dundalk High School.

Academics
Overlea High school received a 42.7 out of a possible 90 points (47%) on the 2018-2019 Maryland State Department of Education Report Card and received a 3 out of 5 star rating, ranking in the 24th percentile among all Maryland schools.

Students
The 2019–2020 enrollment at Overlea High School was 1020 students.

The graduation rate at Overlea has been steady at 79-90% over the past 10 years ending in 2007.

Demographic 
Based on current enrollment information, there are approximately 1,230 students that attend Overlea High School. There are 430 students in the ninth grade, 405 students in the tenth grade, 369 in the eleventh grade, and 332 in the twelfth grade.

Ethnicity distribution 
Of the 1,230 students that attend Overlea High School, 808 (65.7%) of them are Black or African American, 25 (2.1%) are Asian American, 77 (6.3%) are Hispanic or Latino, 279 (22.7%) are White, and 38 (3.1%) are other.

Gender distribution 
Of the 1,230 students, there are 553 (45%) girls and 676 (55%) boys.

Athletics

State Championships
Boys Soccer
One Class 1971
Pre-MPSSAA Class A 1948
Wrestling
Group:
Class 2A-1A Dual Meet 1999
Softball
Class AA 1981

Notable alumni
 Bernard Hopkins, (1992) is a professional basketball player in Spain's Liga ACB.
 Dave Johnson (1977), former Major League pitcher, currently a broadcaster for MASN
 Jamie Miller (1993) drummer for Bad Religion, guitarist/drummer for ...And You Will Know Us by the Trail of Dead, theSTART, drummer for Snot
 Mike Riley, (1993) is an American cartoonist best known as the creator of the webcomic, I Taste Sound
 Mike Rowe, (1980) is an American media personality. He is the host of the Discovery Channel's Dirty Jobs, as well as narrator for other programs on the Discovery Channel

References and notes

 See also List of Schools in Baltimore County, Maryland

External links

 Official site
  

Educational institutions established in 1961
Public high schools in Maryland
Baltimore County Public Schools
Middle States Commission on Secondary Schools
1961 establishments in Maryland